Chiki Sarkar is a book publisher from Kolkata born in 1979
. She is a co-founder of Juggernaut Books.

Background
Chiki Sarkar was born into a Bengali family, the daughter of Aveek Sarkar, a journalist and newspaper proprietor, and his wife Rakhi Sarkar. Aveek Sarkar belongs to the family which runs the Kolkata-based Ananda Bazaar Patrika Media Group, which was first founded in 1876.

Career 
She started her career in publishing with the London-based company Bloomsbury Publishing. She worked there for seven years, and later moved to Delhi in 2006 and joined Random House. In 2011 Chiki Sarkar became the publisher at Penguin Books India. In 2013, publishers Penguin Books and Random House merged and Sarkar was made the India publishing head. Two years later, in 2015, she set up her own publishing company, Juggernaut Books.

A World Economic Forum Young Global Leader, Sarkar is also a Fortune India's Most Powerful Women, Forbes 2018 W-power trailblazers and Economic Times's Rising Women Leaders of 2015.

Career timeline
Bloomsbury Publishing 1999–2006
Random House 2006–2011 founding publisher
Penguin Books India 2011–2013
Penguin Random House 2013–2015
Juggernaut Books founder-publisher 2015–present

Juggernaut Books
In 2015, Sarkar set up her own publication house, Juggernaut Books, a publishing company with its own app. Juggernaut's investors include Nandan Nilekani, Neeraj Aggarwal and Bharti Airtel.

The Juggernaut app has its own writing platform for amateur writers to upload their stories directly.

Juggernaut has published books written by the following authors:
Abhijit Banerjee, Esther Duflo
William Dalrymple
Arundhati Roy
Nandini Sundar
Perumal Murugan
Shyam Saran
Manu S. Pillai
Rajdeep Sardesai
Sourav Ganguly
Twinkle Khanna
Sunny Leone
Yasser Usman
Rajat Gupta
Abdullah Khan Abdullah Khan, author of ‘Patna Blues’, on his long struggle to become a writer
Tony Joseph

External links
 TED-Talk: Chiki Sarkar: How India's smartphone revolution is creating a new generation of readers and writers

References

Indian book publishers (people)
Living people
Year of birth missing (living people)
Businesspeople from Kolkata
Women book publishers (people)
Indian women publishers
Businesswomen from West Bengal
20th-century Indian businesswomen
20th-century Indian businesspeople
21st-century Indian businesswomen
21st-century Indian businesspeople
Sarkar family